2003 Yokohama FC season

Competitions

Domestic results

J.League 2

Emperor's Cup

Player statistics

Other pages
 J. League official site

Yokohama FC
Yokohama FC seasons